The 2003 NFL Europe season was the 11th season in 13 years of the American Football league that started out as the World League of American Football. Three NFL Europe teams had new homes for 2003, Berlin Thunder at Berlin's Olympic Stadium, the F.C. Barcelona Dragons at Mini Estadi, and the Rhein Fire, at Arena AufSchalke in Gelsenkirchen.

Standings

World Bowl XI
World Bowl XI took place on Saturday, June 14, 2003, at Hampden Park in Glasgow, Scotland. Frankfurt Galaxy defeated Rhein Fire, 35–16.

References

 
2003 in American football
NFL Europe (WLAF) seasons